Robert Foster may refer to:

Politics
 Robert Foster (politician) (born 1983), member of Mississippi House of Representatives
Robert E. Foster (1851–1931), member of the Mississippi House of Representatives
 Robert Coleman Foster (1769–1844), member of Tennessee House of Representatives and Senate
 Robert Sidney Foster (1913–2005), governor-general of Fiji

Sports
 Robert Foster (American football) (born 1994), American football wide receiver
 Robert Foster (baseball) (1856–1921), baseball player in 1884
 Robert Foster (cricketer) (1880–1946), Jamaican cricketer
 Robert Foster (hurdler) (born 1970), Jamaican track and field athlete
 Robert Foster (swimmer) (1891–1960), American swimmer

Other
 Robert Foster (judge) (1589–1663), Lord Chief Justice of England
 Robert D. Foster (1811–1878), Latter Day Saint turned opponent of Joseph Smith
 Robert Sanford Foster (1834–1903), Union general
 Robert Foster (RAF officer) (1898–1973), RAF commander during World War II
 Robert Frederick Foster (1853–1945), memory training promoter and author of books on games
 Robert P. Foster (1917–2008), president of Northwest Missouri State University (1964–1977)
 Robert Foster (author) (born 1949), author of The Complete Guide to Middle-earth
 R. F. Foster (historian) (born 1949), British historian
 Robert Foster (bishop) (died 2013), Jamaican bishop of the Moravian Church, see Jamaica Province of the Moravian Church
 Robert A. Foster, actor in Just William
 Robert Foster (screenwriter) (1938–2011), American screenwriter and Executive Producer of Knight Rider
 Robert Foster, stage name of Spanish actor Antonio Mayans, who co-starred in 50 films directed by Jesus Franco

See also 
Bob Foster (disambiguation)
Robert Forster (disambiguation)